These are the late night schedules on all three networks for each calendar season beginning September 1970. All times are Eastern/Pacific.

PBS (which launched on October 5, 1970) is not included, as member television stations have local flexibility over most of their schedules and broadcast times for network shows may vary, CBS and ABC are not included on the weekend schedules (as the networks do not offer late night programs of any kind on weekends).

Talk/Variety shows are highlighted in yellow, Local News & Programs are highlighted in white.

Monday-Friday

Saturday/Sunday

By network

ABC

Returning Series
The Dick Cavett Show

Not returning from 1969-70
The Joey Bishop Show

CBS

Returning Series
The Merv Griffin Show

NBC

Returning Series
The Tonight Show Starring Johnny Carson
The Weekend Tonight Show

United States late night network television schedules
1970 in American television
1971 in American television